The 1885 Men's tennis tour was the tenth annual tennis tour, consisting of 101 tournaments it began at the beginning of the year in January New York City, United States and ended 7 November in Lahore, India.

Summary of tour 

In a repeat of the 1884 final, Herbert Lawford retained his Irish Lawn Tennis Championships title in Dublin, defeating Ernest Renshaw in five sets. William Renshaw won a fifth consecutive Wimbledon Championship. American player James Dwight broke British dominance at the Northern Championships in Manchester, defeating defending champion Donald Stewart in straight sets. In the United States Richard Sears collected a fifth consecutive US National Championship, beating Godfrey Brinley in four sets. In Australia, the New South Wales Championships were held for the first time at the Association Cricket Ground at the Moore Park in Sydney. In England, the British Covered Court Championships, one of the first tournaments in history to be played on indoor courts, is held in London.

American player James Dwight was the title leader for the season, winning 6 titles from 8 finals. He was the first non-European player to do so since 1877.

Calendar 
Notes 1: Challenge round: the final round of a tournament, in which the winner of a single-elimination phase faces the previous year's champion, who plays only that one match. The challenge round was used in the early history of tennis (from 1877 through 1921), in some tournaments not all.* Indicates challenger
Notes 2:Tournaments in italics were events that were staged only once that season

Key

Tournaments in 1885 included:

January

February 
No events

March 
'No events

April

May

June

July

August

September

October

November

December 
No Events

Rankings 

Source: The Concise History of Tennis

Notes

References

Sources 
 "Abolition of Challenge Rounds". paperspast.natlib.govt.nz. EVENING POST, VOLUME CIII, ISSUE 65, 20 MARCH 1922.
 Baily's Monthly Magazine of Sports and Pastimes, and Racing Register, A.H. Baily & Company of Cornhill. London. England. 1860 to 1889.
 Hall, Valentine G[ill (1889). Lawn tennis in America. Biographical sketches of all the prominent players ... knotty points, and all the latest rules and directions governing handicaps, umpires, and rules for playing. New York, USA: New York, D. W. Granbery & co.
 Lake, Robert J. (2014). A Social History of Tennis in Britain: Volume 5 of Routledge Research in Sports History. Routledge. .
 McNicoll, Robin. "Biography:Riddell, Walter John (1859–1930)". adb.anu.edu.au/. Australian Dictionary of Biography, Volume 11, (MUP), 1988.
 Mazak, Karoly (2017). The Concise History of Tennis. Independently published. .
 Nauright, John; Parrish, Charles (2012). Sports Around the World: History, Culture, and Practice. Santa Barbara, Calif.: ABC-CLIO. .
 Nieuwland, Alex (2017). "Tournaments - search for a tournament - year - 1885". www.tennisarchives.com. Harlingen, Netherlands: Idzznew BV.
 Paret, Jahial Parmly; Allen, J. P.; Alexander, Frederick B.; Hardy, Samuel [from old catalog (1918). "Sectional Champions". Spalding's tennis annual . New York, American sports publishing company.
 Myers, A. Wallis, ed. Hillyard, G. W.; Mahony, H. S.; Sterry, Mrs. (1903). Lawn Tennis at Home and Abroad. New York, United States: Charles Scribner's and Sons.
 The "Field" Lawn Tennis Calendar, 1877 to 1920.
 Wright & Ditson Officially Adopted Lawn Tennis Guide. Boston, Mass, USA: Wright & Ditson. 1899.

Further reading 
 Ayre's Lawn Tennis Almanack And Tournament Guide, 1908 to 1938, A. Wallis Myers.
 Baily's Monthly Magazine of Sports and Pastimes, and Racing Register, A.H. Baily & Company of Cornhill. London. England. 1860 to 1889
 Baily's Magazine of Sports and Pastimes, A.H. Baily & Company of Cornhill. London. England. 1889 to 1900
 Baily's Magazine of Sports and Pastimes, Vinton and Co. London. England. 1900 to 1926.
 British Lawn Tennis and Squash Magazine, 1948 to 1967, British Lawn Tennis Ltd, UK.
 Dunlop Lawn Tennis Almanack And Tournament Guide, G.P. Hughes, 1939 to 1958, Dunlop Sports Co. Ltd, UK
 Lawn tennis and Badminton Magazine, 1906 to 1973, UK.
 Lowe's Lawn Tennis Annuals and Compendia, Lowe, Sir F. Gordon, Eyre & Spottiswoode
 Spalding's Lawn Tennis Annuals from 1885 to 1922, American Sports Pub. Co, USA.
 Total Tennis:The Ultimate Tennis Encyclopedia, by Bud Collins, Sport Classic Books, Toronto, Canada, 
 The Tennis Book, edited by Michael Bartlett and Bob Gillen, Arbor House, New York, 1981 
 The World of Tennis Annuals, Barrett John, 1970 to 2001.

Attribution 
This article contains some copied and translated content from this article Tornei di tennis maschili nel 1885 (at Italian Wikipedia)

External links 
 http://www.tennisarchives.com/jTournaments in 1885

Pre Open era tennis seasons
1885 in tennis